ICCR stands for:

 Indian Council for Cultural Relations
 The Interdisciplinary Centre for Comparative Research in the Social Sciences
 Interfaith Center on Corporate Responsibility
 International Centre for Classroom Research
 International Commitment Ceremonies Registrar